Francesco Colonna (1597 – 29 Jun 1653) was a Roman Catholic prelate who served as Bishop of Castro di Puglia (1642–1653).

Biography
Francesco Colonna was born in Milazzo, Italy in 1597. On 16 Jun 1642, he was appointed during the papacy of Pope Urban VIII as Bishop of Castro di Puglia. On 29 Jun 1642, he was consecrated bishop by Giulio Cesare Sacchetti, Cardinal-Priest of Santa Susanna. He served as Bishop of Castro di Puglia until his death on 29 Jun 1653.

See also
Catholic Church in Italy

References

External links and additional sources
 (Chronology of Bishops) 
 (Chronology of Bishops) 

17th-century Italian Roman Catholic bishops
Bishops appointed by Pope Urban VIII
1597 births
1653 deaths